Jazz Contemporary is an album by American jazz trumpeter Kenny Dorham featuring performances recorded in 1960 and released on the Time label. The album features the recording debut of pianist Steve Kuhn.

Reception

The Allmusic review by Scott Yanow awarded the album 2½ stars and stated "The results are not quite essential but everyone plays up to par... It's fine hard bop, the modern mainstream music of the period".

Track listing
All compositions by Kenny Dorham except as indicated

 "A Waltz" - 5:34
 "Monk's Mood" (Thelonious Monk) - 8:09
 "In Your Own Sweet Way" (Dave Brubeck) - 8:01
 "Horn Salute" - 8:27
 "Tonica" - 2:57
 "This Love of Mine" (Sol Parker, Henry W. Sanicola Jr., Frank Sinatra) - 6:49

Bonus tracks on CD reissue:
"Sign Off" - 5:29
"A Waltz" [alternate take] - 5:36
"Monk's Mood" [alternate take] (Monk) - 2:53
"This Love of Mine" [alternate take] (Parker, Sanicola, Sinatra) - 7:55

Recorded on February 11 (tracks 2, 3, 7, 8, 10) and February 12, 1960 (tracks 1, 4-6, 9).

Personnel
Kenny Dorham - trumpet
Charles Davis - baritone saxophone 
Steve Kuhn - piano
Jimmy Garrison (tracks 2, 3, 7, 8 & 10), Butch Warren (tracks 1, 4-6 & 9)  - bass 
Buddy Enlow - drums

References

Kenny Dorham albums
1960 albums
Albums produced by Bob Shad